Douglas Grégoire (born August 27, 1996) is an Innu actor and filmmaker from Quebec. He is most noted for his performance in the film Kuessipan, for which he received a Canadian Screen Award nomination for Best Supporting Actor at the 8th Canadian Screen Awards.

References

External links

1996 births
21st-century First Nations people
Canadian male film actors
Male actors from Quebec
First Nations male actors
Innu people
Living people
Place of birth missing (living people)